Victor Harold Vroom (born August 9, 1932, in Montreal, Quebec, Canada) is a business school professor at the Yale School of Management. He holds a PhD from University of Michigan and an MS and BS from McGill University.

Work
Vroom's primary research was on the expectancy theory of motivation, which attempts to explain why individuals choose to follow certain courses of action and prefer certain goals or outcomes over others in organizations, particularly in decision-making and leadership. His most well-known books are Work and Motivation, Leadership and Decision Making and The New Leadership. In this theory, he suggested that motivation is largely influenced by the combination of a person's belief that effort leads to performance, which then leads to specific outcomes, and that such outcomes are valued by the individual. Along with the version of Lyman Porter and Edward Lawler, Vroom's formulation is generally considered as representing major contributions to expectancy theory, having stood the test of time and historical scrutiny. 

Vroom described the valence of a specific outcome as "a monotonically increasing function of the algebraic sum of the products of the valences of all other outcomes and his conceptions of its instrumentality for the attainment of these other outcomes." The second proposition central to Vroom's theory maintains that "the force on a person to perform an act is monotonically increasing function of the algebraic sum of the products of the valences of all outcomes and the strength of his experiences that the act will be followed by the attainment of these outcomes." 

Vroom has also been a consultant to a number of corporations such as GE and American Express.

Victor Vroom was appointed Chairman of the Department of Administrative Sciences and associate Director of the Institution for Social and Policy Studies at Yale in 1972. Currently, Victor lives in Guilford, Connecticut, with his second wife, Julia Francis, and their two sons, Tristan and Trevor..

Bibliography

Articles

See also
 Normative model of decision-making
 Vroom–Yetton decision model

Notes

External links
Chambly County High School & Chambly Academy Alumni Association Profile of Vroom
Vroom's homepage at Yale School of Management
Value Based Management

Canadian psychologists
Canadian business theorists
Motivation theorists
1932 births
Living people
American people of Dutch descent
Carnegie Mellon University faculty
University of Michigan alumni
Leadership scholars
McGill University alumni